The Great War: Western Front is an upcoming real-time strategy video game based on the First World War. Developed by Petroglyph Games and published by Frontier Foundry, the game is set to be released in March 2023 for Windows PC.

Gameplay
In the game, the player can choose to play as either the Central Powers or the Allied Powers, will both having unique gameplay features and abilities. In the RTS segments of the game, players can spend gold and supplies in order to construct an intricate network of trenches, machine gun nests, artillery batteries, and observation balloons in the set-up phase of each combat engagement. They can also place different military units and battalions along the trench. Once a battle has started, improving defense or introducing more units to the battle will cost the player more supplies. A battalion can be commanded and transverse across the no man's land to attack an opponent's trenches. A successful attack will allow players to claim ownership of said trench, allowing players to advance forward. As the player progresses in the game, they will unlock new weapons and technology such as tanks and chemical weapons. There are nine outcomes for each skirmish, ranging from great loss to great victory. If the players fail to advance and has nearly used up most of their resources, they can also negotiate for a ceasefire, while the defenders can also surrender so as to preserve resources and preventing further causalities.

Players can also access a theatre map to view their progress in the overall war. Each region in the Western Front has a certain number of "stars", indicative of how defensible it is. Stars can only be removed from a region once the player has achieved a decisive victory over their opponents. Achieving a minor victory would not aid the player in capturing a region, but it will deplete their opponent's "national will". A region will regain its star in each turn if it has not been attacked, but the troops stationed there will become fatigued. Players win by capturing all enemy capitals in the theatre map, or completely strain their opponents of their "National Will". If the player completely depletes their "national will" by taking heavy casualties in each skirmish, they will lose the game.

Development
The Great War: Western Front is currently being developed by Petroglyph Games, which previously worked on Star Wars: Empire at War and Command & Conquer Remastered Collection. Petroglyph and publisher Frontier Foundry announced the game in August 2022. It is currently slated for release on March 30, 2023, for Windows PC.

Discussing the game's setting, lead designer Chris Becker described the First World War as "a war of attrition and a battle of inches". As a result, the team worked to ensure that the major goal for the players is to maintain their national will rather than winning each individual battle. Players need to balance the victory and its cost when making tactical decisions at the battlefield, as achieving a victory may comes with a significant drain of their faction's national will. Petroglyph collaborated with Imperial War Museums to ensure that the game was authentic to its setting. According to the team, the game features a "persistent battlefield", as the actions of the players and the destruction caused by previous conflicts will be clearly visible when they revisit a battlefield. The in-game will also change, affecting unit movement and artillery performance. The team hoped that players would develop new strategies through familiarity with the maps, allowing them to achieve victory at a lower cost.

References

External links
 

Upcoming video games scheduled for 2023
Video games developed in the United States
World War I video games
Turn-based strategy video games
Real-time strategy video games
Windows games
Video games set in France
Video games set in Germany
Video games set in Luxembourg
Video games set in Belgium
Frontier Developments games
Petroglyph Games games
Multiplayer and single-player video games